る, in hiragana, or ル in katakana, is one of the Japanese kana, each of which represent one mora. The hiragana is written in one stroke; the katakana in two. Both represent the sound . The Ainu language uses a small katakana ㇽ to represent a final r sound after an u sound (ウㇽ ur). The combination of an R-column kana letter with handakuten ゜- る゚ in hiragana, and ル゚ in katakana was introduced to represent [lu] in the early 20th century.

Stroke order

The hiragana for ru (る) is made with one stroke, and its katakana form (ル) is made with two.

る (hiragana) begins with a horizontal stroke to the right, followed by a slightly longer, angular stroke going down and to the left. Finally, a curve and loop are added to the bottom that somewhat resembles the hiragana no (の). The character as a whole is visually similar to the hiragana for ro (ろ).

ル (katakana) is made by first making a curved stroke going down and to the left, and is followed by a stroke that first goes straight down, and then a curved line going up and to the right.

Other communicative representations

 Full Braille representation

 Computer encodings

See also
Japanese phonology

References

Specific kana